Artur Viktorovich Shleyermakher (born 29 December 1997) is a Russian football player who plays for FC Irtysh Omsk.

Club career
He made his debut in the Russian Football National League for FC Irtysh Omsk on 1 August 2020 in a game against FC Yenisey Krasnoyarsk, he substituted Artyom Tretyakov in the 56th minute.

References

External links
 
 Profile by Russian Football National League
 

1997 births
Sportspeople from Omsk
Living people
Russian footballers
Association football midfielders
FC Irtysh Omsk players
FC Mordovia Saransk players